Aquatic play is play activity involving water.  Aquatic play facilities are commonly installed in neighbourhoods, in the form of splash pads, "spraygrounds", urban beaches, or other aquatic play equipment such as hydraulophones.

Splash pads and spraygrounds
A common form of aquatic play is the splash pad or sprayground, which appeals mainly to children.

Age-inclusive aquatic play
More recently, aquatic play features have been designed with a level of sophistication and intricacy that will appeal to people of all ages, including children as well as adults, the elderly, and persons with special needs.

The urban beach attempts to create this level of sophistication, by way of age-inclusive aquatic play devices such as the hydraulophone, a musical instrument that uses only a small amount of water in order to create a fun and playful space that engages both the mind and body.

Water sports